Tabrizi is a surname originating in Tabriz, Iran. Notable people with the surname include:

Ali Tabrizi, a 14th/15th century Iranian woodcarver
Behrooz Ghamari-Tabrizi (born 1960), Iranian-born American scholar, professor of historian and sociologist of Iran
Homam-e Tabrizi (or Homamiddin ibni Ala-e Tabrizi), an Iranian poet
Jawad Tabrizi (1926–2006), a 20th-century Iranian Shia marja'
Kamal Tabrizi, an Iranian film director
Maqsud-Ali Tabrizi, a 17th-century Iranian physician
Mir Ali Tabrizi, a 14th-century Iranian calligraphist, to whom the invention of Nasta'liq calligraphy style is attributed
Mirza Abdul'Rahim Talibov Tabrizi, a 19th-20th century Iranian intellectual and social reformer
Muhammad ibn Muhammad Tabrizi, a 13th-century Persian Muslim commentator on Maimonides
Rami Tabrizi, a 14th-century Persian poet
Qatran Tabrizi, a 9th-century Iranian poet
Saib Tabrizi, a 17th-century Iranian poet
Sarah Tabrizi, a British neuroscientist
Shams Tabrizi, an 11th-century Iranian Sufi mystic
Badr al-Din Tabrizi, a 13th-century Iranian architect and scholar

See also
List of people from Tabriz

Iranian-language surnames
Toponymic surnames